{{Infobox settlement
|name                     = Goodland, Kansas
|settlement_type          = City and County seat
|nickname                 = The Golden Buckle on the Wheat Belt

|image_skyline            = World's largest easel in Goodland, Kansas 5-20-2014.jpg
|image_caption            = Oversized reproduction of van Gogh's Sunflowers (2014)
|image_flag               =
|image_seal               =

|image_map                = Sherman_County_Kansas_Incorporated_and_Unincorporated_areas_Goodland_Highlighted.svg
|map_caption              = Location within Sherman County and Kansas
|image_map1               = Map of Sherman Co, Ks, USA.png
|map_caption1             = KDOT map of Sherman County (legend)

|coordinates_footnotes    = 
|coordinates              = 
|subdivision_type         = Country
|subdivision_name         = United States
|subdivision_type1        = State
|subdivision_name1        = Kansas
|subdivision_type2        = County
|subdivision_name2        = Sherman
|subdivision_type3        = Township
|subdivision_name3        =

|established_title        = Founded
|established_date         = 1887
|established_title1       = Platted
|established_date1        =
|established_title2       = Incorporated
|established_date2        = 1887
|named_for                = Goodland, Indiana

|government_footnotes     =
|government_type          = Council-Manager
|leader_title             = Mayor
|leader_name              = Brian Linin
|leader_title1            = City Manager
|leader_name1             = Andrew Finzen

|area_footnotes           = 
|area_total_sq_mi         = 4.51
|area_land_sq_mi          = 4.50
|area_water_sq_mi         = 0.01
|area_total_km2           = 11.67
|area_land_km2            = 11.66
|area_water_km2           = 0.02
|unit_pref                = Imperial

|elevation_footnotes      = 
|elevation_ft             = 3681

|population_footnotes     = 
|population_as_of         = 2020
|population_total         = 4465
|pop_est_footnotes        =
|pop_est_as_of            =
|population_est           =
|population_density_sq_mi = auto
|population_density_km2   = auto

|timezone                 = Mountain (MST)
|utc_offset               = -7
|timezone_DST             = MDT
|utc_offset_DST           = -6
|postal_code_type         = ZIP code
|postal_code              = 67735
|area_code_type           = Area code
|area_code                = 785
|blank_name               = FIPS code
|blank_info               = 20-26875 
|blank1_name              = GNIS ID
|blank1_info              = 471241 
|website                  = 
}}

Goodland is a city in and the county seat of Sherman County, Kansas, United States.  As of the 2020 census, the population of the city was 4,465.  It was named after Goodland, Indiana.  Goodland is home to Northwest Kansas Technical College.

History
One of the earliest pieces of recorded history relating to Goodland concerns the Kidder Massacre. On July 2, 1867, a detachment of the 2nd Cavalry Regiment (United States) was massacred; second lieutenant Lyman S. Kidder in command of the party, a sergeant, a corporal, eight privates and an Indian guide lost their lives. They were carrying dispatches for Lieutenant Colonel George Custer. Later, Custer found evidence of a running battle along Beaver Creek, which led to a ravine where the remains were found. They had been killed by Cheyenne and/or Sioux Indians.

In 1886, there were four communities vying to become county seat for Sherman County: Itasca, Voltaire, Sherman Center and Eustis. A man named Clark showed up in the county in 1887 proposing to create a new town to settle the dispute. The new town was to be named Goodland. A vote for the county seat was held among the county population and Goodland won with 872 of the 1495 votes cast while with Eustis received 611 and Voltaire received 12. Citizens of Eustis declared that the votes were unfair but the state department said that nothing could be done as all the voting was complete. The Supreme Court of Kansas considered various proceedings but did not change the outcome of the vote. Eustis refused to yield the county records it held until January 13, 1888, when an armed group from Goodland seized the records and sent them to the new county seat.

Goodland sprang up around the Chicago, Rock Island and Pacific Railroad that had been built through it. The town was named after Goodland, Indiana.

Geography
Goodland is located at  (39.3508330, −101.7101722) at an elevation of 3,681 feet (1,122 m). It lies on the south side of the Middle Fork of Sappa Creek, part of the Republican River watershed, in the High Plains region of the Great Plains.

Climate
Goodland's climate is officially classed as humid continental (Koppen Dfa); although it only just misses a semi-arid (Bsk) classification and is also close to a wet-summer continental climate (Dwa). Winters are generally cold and dry, summers hot and moderately wet. The average temperature for the year is 51 °F (10 °C) with temperatures exceeding 90 °F (32 °C) an average of 50 days a year and dropping below 32 °F (0 °C) an average of 159 days a year. Due to its higher elevation, Goodland experiences stronger wind and higher snowfall totals than other locations in Kansas. Wind speed averages . On average, Goodland receives 19.75 inches (502 mm) of precipitation annually, and snowfall averages 41.9 inches (1,064 mm) per year. On average, January is the coolest month, and July is both the warmest month and the wettest month. The hottest temperature recorded in Goodland was 111 °F (44 °C) in 1940; the coldest temperature recorded was −27 °F (−33 °C) in 1989.

Demographics

2010 census
As of the census of 2010, there were 4,489 people, 1,985 households, and 1,161 families residing in the city. The racial makeup of the city was 93.0% White, 0.7% African American, 0.4% Native American, 0.4% Asian, 0.1% Pacific Islander, 3.3% from other races, and 2.1% from two or more races. Hispanic or Latino of any race were 11.0% of the population.

There were 1,985 households, of which 27.6% had children under the age of 18 living with them, 44.2% were married couples living together, 10.0% had a female householder with no husband present, 4.3% had a male householder with no wife present, and 41.5% were non-families. 36.0% of all households were made up of individuals, and 15.5% had someone living alone who was 65 years of age or older. The average household size was 2.21 and the average family size was 2.85.

The median age in the city was 40 years. 22.7% of residents were under the age of 18; 10.1% were between the ages of 18 and 24; 22.2% were from 25 to 44; 25.9% were from 45 to 64; and 19% were 65 years of age or older. The gender makeup of the city was 49.3% male and 50.7% female.

2000 census
As of the census of 2000, there were 4,948 people, 2,085 households, and 1,259 families residing in the city. The racial makeup of the city was 93.35% White, 0.42% African American, 0.32% Native American, 0.24% Asian, 0.12% Pacific Islander, 4.53% from other races, and 1.01% from two or more races. Hispanic or Latino of any race were 9.03% of the population.

There were 2,085 households, out of which 27.6% had children under the age of 18 living with them, 50.5% were married couples living together, 7.1% had a female householder with no husband present, and 39.6% were non-families. 32.4% of all households were made up of individuals, and 16.0% had someone living alone who was 65 years of age or older. The average household size was 2.31 and the average family size was 2.95.

In the city, the population was spread out, with 23.3% under the age of 18, 13.9% from 18 to 24, 23.3% from 25 to 44, 21.5% from 45 to 64, and 18.0% who were 65 years of age or older. The median age was 37 years. For every 100 females, there were 103.4 males. For every 100 females age 18 and over, there were 100.6 males.

As of 2000 the median income for a household in the city was $31,356, and the median income for a family was $38,309. Males had a median income of $28,589 versus $20,798 for females. The per capita income for the city was $17,105. About 9.7% of families and 12.1% of the population were below the poverty line, including 11.4% of those under age 18 and 8.1% of those age 65 or over.

Government

Goodland utilizes a council-manager style of government. Five commissioners are elected at large. A mayor is elected from among the commission to serve ceremonial purposes and chair the commission meetings. The commission is responsible for appointing a city manager, who handles the day-to-day operations of the city.

Goodland has a full-time police department that provides 24/7 law enforcement coverage within the city limits.

The city also boasts its own power plant, which ensures that citizens can access electricity even if outside power sources become unavailable.

The National Weather Service maintains a full-featured Weather Forecast Office in Goodland with doppler radar and a 19 County Warning Area (CWA) including three counties in eastern Colorado, three counties in southwest Nebraska and 13 counties in northwest Kansas. Aviation forecasts are created for two sites: Goodland, Kansas, and McCook, Nebraska. The office also has a fire weather and hydrologic program. The surface observation program is limited to the supplemental climatological observations. The office supports approximately 75 observers in the cooperative observer program. The office employs 22 people.

Education

Primary and secondary education
Unified School District 352 operates three public schools in the city:
 West Elementary School (Grades from pre-kindergarten to 2)
 North School (3–6)
 Goodland Junior Senior High School (7–12)

Colleges and universities
 Northwest Kansas Technical College

MediaThe Goodland Star-News is the city's sole newspaper, published twice weekly.
Four radio stations are licensed to and/or broadcast from Goodland. KLOE broadcasts a full service News/Talk format on 730 AM. KKCI plays a Classic Rock format, broadcasting on 102.5 FM. KWGB, which is licensed to Colby, Kansas, broadcasts from Goodland on 97.9 FM, playing a Country format. Licensed to Goodland, KGCR broadcasts on 107.7 FM from near Brewster, Kansas, playing a Christian Contemporary format.

Goodland is in the Wichita-Hutchinson, Kansas television market. CBS affiliate KBSL-DT, a satellite station of KWCH-DT in Wichita, is licensed to Goodland and broadcasts on digital channel 10.

Due to Goodland and the rest of Sherman County observing Mountain time, prime-time television programming airs from 6 to 9 p.m., instead of 7 to 10 as is normal in the Central time zone.

Culture

Attractions
An 80-foot high reproduction of Vincent van Gogh's painting 3 Sunflowers in a Vase was erected in 2001 by artist Cameron Cross. After the installation suffered damage from exposure to the weather, Cross returned in 2012 to repaint the piece using a brighter palette.

The High Plains Museum includes a replica of the "gyrocopter", a commercially unsuccessful powered helicopter built in Goodland. After the company formed to build the machine disbanded, it was awarded a patent in 1912, believed to be the first United States patent for a rotary-winged aircraft.

In popular culture
In L.E. Howel's novel, Planetfall'', Goodland is the hometown of astronaut Karla Dawson and is a featured location in the story.
In T.D. Shields' novels, "Into Shadow" and "Into Light," Goodland is the site of the new national capital after Washington D.C. (among many other cities) is destroyed by war and climate change.
"Goodland" (2014) directed by Josh Doke is set in a fictional rendering of the town and is shot primarily in and around the City of Goodland.
Goodland is mentioned along with other small Kansas towns in issue 37 of the Vertigo comic book series "The Sandman".

Notable people

Notable individuals who were born in and/or have lived in Goodland include:
 Milo Baughman (1923–2003), furniture designer
 Brook Berringer (1973–1996), football quarterback for University of Nebraska
 John Delehant (1890–1972), U.S. federal judge
 Harry Felt (1902–1992), U.S. Navy Admiral
 Mike Friede (1957- ), football wide receiver 
 Dave Jones (1947– ), football wide receiver
 Tinker Keck (1976– ), actor and former NFL for the New York Giants and football player for University of Cincinnati
 Marla Luckert (1955– ), Kansas Supreme Court justice
 Charles Sparks (1872–1937), U.S. Representative from Kansas
 Deanell Tacha (1946– ), U.S. federal judge

See also
 AN/URC-117 Ground Wave Emergency Network

References

Further reading

External links

 City of Goodland
 Goodland - Directory of Public Officials
 USD 352, local school district
 Giant van Gogh painting Part of the Big Easel Project
 Goodland city map, KDOT

Cities in Kansas
County seats in Kansas
Cities in Sherman County, Kansas
Populated places established in 1887
1887 establishments in Kansas